The International Society for Music Education (ISME) is a professional organization of persons involved with music education. It was founded in Brussels in 1953 during the UNESCO-sponsored conference on "The Role and Place of Music in the Education of Youth and Adults". ISME's mission is to build a worldwide network of music educators, to advocate music education globally and across the lifespan, and to foster intercultural understanding and cooperation.

Activities 
ISME holds conferences every two years in a different part of the world and include workshops, paper presentations, keynote addresses, symposia, and performances. In addition, ISME supports regional conferences in Africa, Asia Pacific, Europe, and the Americas, and has a range of specialist interest groups to nurture particular areas of music education. These specialist groups include seven long-established commissions that are focused on: research; community music activity; early childhood music education; education of the professional musician; policy: culture, education and media; music in schools and teacher education; and music in special education, music therapy and music medicine. Each commission holds a biennial seminar, usually immediately prior to the main conference. In addition, the world conference includes a forum for instrumental and vocal teachers.

The society is present in over 90 countries and in December 2020 there were nearly 2,500 ISME individual members. International partner and affiliate organisations increase ISME's reach to around 100,000 music educators globals.

ISME's main sponsors are the NAMM Foundation.

Publications 
The International Journal of Music Education is the official journal of the ISME and is published four times a year by SAGE Publications.  ISME also produce a series of academic books through Routledge Publishing each year.

Co-ordination and advisory work 
The ISME International Office co-ordinates all communication related to the work of the society. ISME acts in an advisory capacity to UNESCO and is a member of and closely affiliated to the International Music Council.

References

External links
 
 ISME Archives – Special Collections in Performing Arts at the University of Maryland
Edmund Cykler Collection of International Music Education Resources at the University of Maryland Libraries

Music education organizations
International cultural organizations
Organizations established in 1953
Music organisations based in Australia